The 1997 Utah State Aggies football team represented Utah State University in the 1997 NCAA Division I-A football season. The team was led by third-year head coach John L. Smith and played their home games at Romney Stadium in Logan, Utah.

The Aggies were defeated by Cincinnati, 35–19, in their last bowl appearance until 2011. Smith left for Louisville after the season, and was succeeded by Dave Arslanian in 1998.

Schedule

References

Utah State
Big West Conference football champion seasons
Utah State Aggies football seasons
Las Vegas Bowl champion seasons
Utah State Aggies football